Mount Prospect is a station on Metra's Union Pacific Northwest Line located in Mount Prospect, Illinois. The station is located at 13 E. Northwest Highway near its intersection with Main St. (Illinois Route 83).

The station has three tracks; an outbound track to the southwest, an inbound track to the northeast, and a bidirectional express track in the middle. There is a station house on the inbound platform where tickets may be purchased. Parking is available near Mount Prospect.

As of April 25, 2022, Mount Prospect is served by 55 trains (27 inbound, 28 outbound) on weekdays, by 31 trains (16 inbound, 15 outbound) on Saturdays, and by 19 trains (nine inbound, 10 outbound) on Sundays.

Bus connections
Pace

  234 Wheeling/Des Plaines (weekdays only)
  694 Central Road/Mt. Prospect Station (weekday rush hours only)

References

External links
Metra – Mount Prospect
Station from Main Street from Google Maps Street View

Mount Prospect
Mount Prospect, Illinois
Former Chicago and North Western Railway stations
Railway stations in Cook County, Illinois
Railway stations in the United States opened in 1930